The Moment of Silence is an investigative thriller adventure game developed in 2004 by German developer House of Tales.

Story 

The game is set in the year 2044 in downtown New York City, in a future with many Orwellian influences.  The player plays an advertising agency worker named Peter Wright, who is depressed and drinking heavily after the death of his wife and child in a terrorist attack. One night, as he is drinking, he hears a commotion in the hall. Looking out through the peephole in his apartment door, he sees a SWAT team storm the apartment of his next door neighbor and carry out a middle-aged man, much to the pain and anguish of his wife.  Peter learns that the man was a freelance journalist named Graham Oswald, and is asked by his wife to discover what had happened to him.

Attempting to investigate, Peter is deflected at every turn by the police who begin to investigate him, a branch of Luddites, and even online acquaintances. Eventually Peter is informed he's won a "Vacation" to an orbiting station which is a cover for a rehabilitation clinic, and he meets a number of intellectual and political figures who've been removed from society, as well as a factory of automated drones. Peter sabotages the drone factory and escapes the station, and is sent to prison on Governor's Island, the only inmate but learns Oswald was recently there. Peter removes a tracking implant he is surgically installed with and escapes by swimming to shore.

Escaping underground, Peter discovers a dying Oswald, who is on his last legs after a harrowing escape from a prison on Governors Island.  Before dying, Oswald tells Peter that he must go to Alaska and complete the mission that Oswald failed.  After Peter arrives in Alaska, he discovers that the government is being run by a dystopian artificial intelligence, whose only concern is keeping the world tidy and in order, and has slowly begun to erase evidence of its existence. The computer also reveals that it has been watching Peter for a long time, and that it engages in massive social manipulation, having been several of the online friends he has. It further threatens Peter that if it is deactivated, it will launch a set of nuclear weapons, including one at Peter's home. Peter successfully shuts down the computer system, and manages to abort the launches. In the epilogue, Peter's computer pops up with a message from an online contact, asking if Peter wants to be friends.

Release 
The game was published by several different publishers around the world. In Germany the game was published by dtp in November 2004 and featured an extensive German voice cast, which included the German voice actors for Bruce Willis and Julia Roberts. In the United Kingdom, Digital Jesters published the game until their demise in early 2006. It is unclear if the game is still in print in Britain. In North America, The Adventure Company won the rights to publish the game, which it did starting in 2005.

A major controversy in the European versions of the game involved the use of StarForce copy protection software, which covertly installed itself on the computers of users who installed the game. The software sometimes caused a user's system to crash, or become unresponsive, even if there was no copying software on that computer.  The North American version of the game does not use Starforce.

The game was re-released DRM-free in 2015 with Windows 10 support on the GOG.com website.

Reception

Domestic 

Chris Kellner of German publisher DTP Entertainment reported that The Moment of Silence was a commercial success in his country. Alongside titles such as The Black Mirror and Sherlock Holmes: The Case of the Silver Earring, it contributed to DTP's large-scale growth during 2004.

International 
According to review aggregation website Metacritic, The Moment of Silence received "mixed or average reviews" from critics.

See also 
Ankh
Syberia II
The Black Mirror
The Westerner

References

External links 
Official website via Internet Archive

2004 video games
House of Tales games
Fiction set in 2044
Adventure games
Dystopian video games
Point-and-click adventure games
The Adventure Company games
Video games developed in Germany
Video games set in New York City
Video games set in the 2040s
Windows games
Windows-only games
Cyberpunk video games
Digital Jesters games
Single-player video games
DTP Entertainment games